Lonchocarpus salvadorensis, the Sangre de Chucho, is a plant species in the genus Lonchocarpus.

The rotenoids deguelin, rotenone, elliptone and α-toxicarol can be found in the seeds of L. salvadorensis.

References

External links

salvadorensis